Old Stratford is a village and wider civil parish in the south of the English county of Northamptonshire. The population of the civil parish (including Passenham) at the 2011 Census was 1,935. The 'Stratford' part of the village name is Anglo-Saxon in origin and means 'ford on a Roman road'. The Roman road in this sense is the Watling Street that runs through the middle of the village.

Location
The village lies immediately north of where the Watling Street crossed the River Great Ouse; just south of this crossing point is the town of Stony Stratford in Milton Keynes. (The ford was replaced by a causeway and stone bridge many years ago). The Ouse forms the boundary of the civil parish with that of Stony Stratford and also that between Northamptonshire and Buckinghamshire. The village is located adjacent to the junction of the A5 (northwards towards Towcester and southwards towards Milton Keynes), the A422 (westwards towards Buckingham) and the A508 (northwards towards Northampton).

History
The Buckingham Arm of the Grand Union Canal passed through the village but has been disused since 1964. There remains a  "Wharf Lane" and signs of the path of the old canal through the village towards Buckingham.

Facilities
The village has a few local facilities (two motor dealers, a Chinese takeaway, an Indian restaurant and a corner shop), and relies on Stony Stratford and Milton Keynes for a broader range of shops as well as for its medical, financial and other professional needs.

There is a primary school part of West Northamptonshire Council local education authority. The nearest secondary school is in Deanshanger.

Administration
The village has a parish council, which also administers the nearby village of Passenham.

The village is governed by West Northamptonshire council. Prior to local government changes in 2021 it was administered by South Northamptonshire District Council, based in Towcester and also Northamptonshire County Council.

The "Stony Stratford" Hoard

The Stony Stratford Hoard was probably found in 1789, near Passenham in the parish of Old Stratford, across the River Ouse from Stony Stratford.  It is not known where it originally came from or how it got there. Even the location of the find-spot is somewhat speculative, since the only recorded information is "Windmill Field".

References

External links 
The 'Old Stratford Remembered Group'

Villages in Northamptonshire
West Northamptonshire District
Civil parishes in Northamptonshire